"For the Strength of Youth" is a pamphlet distributed by the Church of Jesus Christ of Latter-day Saints (LDS Church) that "summarizes standards from scripture and from the writings and teachings of Church leaders." The pamphlet's target audience is young men and young women of the LDS Church, although its principles are applicable to all age groups in the church. It is available on the Internet and in print form. The pamphlet was first published in 1965, with its 10th and most recent edition released in 2022. The pamphlet was to be put "in the hands of every young person in each ward".

History
The LDS Church first published "For the Strength of Youth" in 1965. Subsequent editions were published in 1966, two in 1968, 1969, 1972, 1990, 2001, 2011, and most recently in 2022 (10th edition).
The first edition of the pamphlet had 16 pages, while the ninth edition has 44 pages. Regarding the 2011 version, Young Women general president Elaine S. Dalton said, "The standards have not changed, but times have changed....For the Strength of Youth has been revised to address the issues youth face today—to teach them the doctrine behind the standards and the promised blessings of obedience." The covers evolved from a depiction of a family in the first five editions to depictions of youth in the 1972 and 1990 versions which were replaced with images of the Salt Lake Temple in some editions, a reflection of what was called an "additional emphasis ... on living worthy to attend the temple" in the youth guidelines, while then returning to images of youth in the most recent version, released in 2022. The 10th edition also added a subtitle, with it now called "For the Strength of Youth: A Guide for Making Choices."

Contents
The current (10th) edition (2022) contains the follow sections:
 Message from the First Presidency
 Make inspired choices
 Jesus Christ will help you
 Love God, love your neighbor
 Walk in God’s light
 Your body is sacred
 Truth will make you free
 Find joy in Christ
 Appendix

Homosexuality

The first explicit mention of homosexuality was contained in the 1990 seventh version of the pamphlet where it says, "the Lord specifically forbids ... sex perversion such as homosexuality". It continues "homosexual and lesbian activities are sinful and an abomination to the Lord" and "unnatural affections ... toward persons of the same gender are counter to God's eternal plan". The 2001 eighth version removes any mention of "unnatural affections" and "abomination" and only states, "homosexual activity is a serious sin. If you find your-self struggling with same-gender attraction, seek counsel from your parents and bishop. They will help you." In 2011, the ninth version was released adding to the 2001 paragraph that "lesbian behavior" is also a "serious sin" and that the youth should speak to their parents and bishop if they "are being persuaded to participate in inappropriate behavior".

For the Strength of Youth conferences 
In 2019, the LDS Church announced the intent to begin regional week-long youth activities called For the Strength of Youth (FSY) conference worldwide in 2020. Such conferences have been previously held outside of the United States and Canada. The FSY conferences in the United States and Canada replaced Especially for Youth conferences that had been operated by church-owned Brigham Young University for more than 40 years. A press release explains, "FSY conferences include activities, devotionals, and classes designed to help strengthen faith in Jesus Christ and provide opportunities for youth to grow spiritually, socially, physically, and intellectually." The starting of FSY conferences in the United States and Canada was delayed until 2021, due to the coronavirus pandemic.

See also
Duty to God Award
Personal Progress
Sexuality and Mormonism
Culture of The Church of Jesus Christ of Latter-day Saints
Beliefs and practices of The Church of Jesus Christ of Latter-day Saints

References

External links
Official pamphlet companion website
Official pamphlet: 9th edition (2011)
Official Pamphlet: 10th edition (2022) 
FSY Conference website

1965 non-fiction books
1965 in Christianity
Latter Day Saint statements of faith
Pamphlets
Religious works for children
The Church of Jesus Christ of Latter-day Saints texts
Young Men (organization)
Young people and the Church of Jesus Christ of Latter-day Saints
Young Women (organization)